Doppler spectroscopy (also known as the radial-velocity method, or colloquially, the wobble method) is an indirect method for finding extrasolar planets and brown dwarfs from radial-velocity measurements via observation of Doppler shifts in the spectrum of the planet's parent star.

1,018 extrasolar planets (about 19.5% of the total) have been discovered using Doppler spectroscopy, as of November 2022.

History 

Otto Struve proposed in 1952 the use of powerful spectrographs to detect distant planets. He described how a very large planet, as large as Jupiter, for example, would cause its parent star to wobble slightly as the two objects orbit around their center of mass. He predicted that the small Doppler shifts to the light emitted by the star, caused by its continuously varying radial velocity, would be detectable by the most sensitive spectrographs as tiny redshifts and blueshifts in the star's emission. However, the technology of the time produced radial-velocity measurements with errors of 1,000 m/s or more, making them useless for the detection of orbiting planets. The expected changes in radial velocity are very small – Jupiter causes the Sun to change velocity by about 12.4 m/s over a period of 12 years, and the Earth's effect is only 0.1 m/s over a period of 1 year – so long-term observations by instruments with a very high resolution are required.

Advances in spectrometer technology and observational techniques in the 1980s and 1990s produced instruments capable of detecting the first of many new extrasolar planets. The ELODIE spectrograph, installed at the Haute-Provence Observatory in Southern France in 1993, could measure radial-velocity shifts as low as 7 m/s, low enough for an extraterrestrial observer to detect Jupiter's influence on the Sun. Using this instrument, astronomers Michel Mayor and Didier Queloz identified 51 Pegasi b, a "Hot Jupiter" in the constellation Pegasus. Although planets had previously been detected orbiting pulsars, 51 Pegasi b was the first planet ever confirmed to be orbiting a main-sequence star, and the first detected using Doppler spectroscopy.

In November 1995, the scientists published their findings in the journal Nature; the paper has since been cited over 1,000 times. Since that date, over 1,000 exoplanet candidates have been identified, many of which have been detected by Doppler search programs based at the Keck, Lick, and Anglo-Australian Observatories (respectively, the California, Carnegie and Anglo-Australian planet searches), and teams based at the Geneva Extrasolar Planet Search.

Beginning in the early 2000s, a second generation of planet-hunting spectrographs permitted far more precise measurements. The HARPS spectrograph, installed at the La Silla Observatory in Chile in 2003, can identify radial-velocity shifts as small as 0.3 m/s, enough to locate many rocky, Earth-like planets. A third generation of spectrographs is expected to come online in 2017. With measurement errors estimated below 0.1 m/s, these new instruments would allow an extraterrestrial observer to detect even Earth.

Procedure 

A series of observations is made of the spectrum of light emitted by a star. Periodic variations in the star's spectrum may be detected, with the wavelength of characteristic spectral lines in the spectrum increasing and decreasing regularly over a period of time. Statistical filters are then applied to the data set to cancel out spectrum effects from other sources. Using mathematical best-fit techniques, astronomers can isolate the tell-tale periodic sine wave that indicates a planet in orbit.

If an extrasolar planet is detected, a minimum mass for the planet can be determined from the changes in the star's radial velocity. To find a more precise measure of the mass requires knowledge of the inclination of the planet's orbit. A graph of measured radial velocity versus time will give a characteristic curve (sine curve in the case of a circular orbit), and the amplitude of the curve will allow the minimum mass of the planet to be calculated using the binary mass function.

The Bayesian Kepler periodogram is a mathematical algorithm, used to detect single or multiple extrasolar planets from successive radial-velocity measurements of the star they are orbiting. It involves a Bayesian statistical analysis of the radial-velocity data, using a prior probability distribution over the space determined by one or more sets of Keplerian orbital parameters. This analysis may be implemented using the Markov chain Monte Carlo (MCMC) method.

The method has been applied to the HD 208487 system, resulting in an apparent detection of a second planet with a period of approximately 1000 days. However, this may be an artifact of stellar activity. The method is also applied to the HD 11964 system, where it found an apparent planet with a period of approximately 1 year. However, this planet was not found in re-reduced data, suggesting that this detection was an artifact of the Earth's orbital motion around the Sun.

Although radial-velocity of the star only gives a planet's minimum mass, if the planet's spectral lines can be distinguished from the star's spectral lines then the radial-velocity of the planet itself can be found and this gives the inclination of the planet's orbit and therefore the planet's actual mass can be determined. The first non-transiting planet to have its mass found this way was Tau Boötis b in 2012 when carbon monoxide was detected in the infra-red part of the spectrum.

Example 

The graph to the right illustrates the sine curve using Doppler spectroscopy to observe the radial velocity of an imaginary star which is being orbited by a planet in a circular orbit. Observations of a real star would produce a similar graph, although eccentricity in the orbit will distort the curve and complicate the calculations below.

This theoretical star's velocity shows a periodic variance of ±1 m/s, suggesting an orbiting mass that is creating a gravitational pull on this star. Using Kepler's third law of planetary motion, the observed period of the planet's orbit around the star (equal to the period of the observed variations in the star's spectrum) can be used to determine the planet's distance from the star using the following equation:

where:
r is the distance of the planet from the star
G is the gravitational constant
Mstar is the mass of the star 
Pstar is the observed period of the star

Having determined , the velocity of the planet around the star can be calculated using Newton's law of gravitation, and the orbit equation:

where  is the velocity of planet.

The mass of the planet can then be found from the calculated velocity of the planet:

where  is the velocity of parent star. The observed Doppler velocity, where i is the inclination of the planet's orbit to the line perpendicular to the line-of-sight.

Thus, assuming a value for the inclination of the planet's orbit and for the mass of the star, the observed changes in the radial velocity of the star can be used to calculate the mass of the extrasolar planet.

Radial-velocity comparison tables

Ref:

For MK-type stars with planets in the habitable zone

Limitations 
The major limitation with Doppler spectroscopy is that it can only measure movement along the line-of-sight, and so depends on a measurement (or estimate) of the inclination of the planet's orbit to determine the planet's mass. If the orbital plane of the planet happens to line up with the line-of-sight of the observer, then the measured variation in the star's radial velocity is the true value. However, if the orbital plane is tilted away from the line-of-sight, then the true effect of the planet on the motion of the star will be greater than the measured variation in the star's radial velocity, which is only the component along the line-of-sight. As a result, the planet's true mass will be greater than measured.

To correct for this effect, and so determine the true mass of an extrasolar planet, radial-velocity measurements can be combined with astrometric observations, which track the movement of the star across the plane of the sky, perpendicular to the line-of-sight. Astrometric measurements allows researchers to check whether objects that appear to be high mass planets are more likely to be brown dwarfs.

A further disadvantage is that the gas envelope around certain types of stars can expand and contract, and some stars are variable. This method is unsuitable for finding planets around these types of stars, as changes in the stellar emission spectrum caused by the intrinsic variability of the star can swamp the small effect caused by a planet.

The method is best at detecting very massive objects close to the parent star – so-called "hot Jupiters" – which have the greatest gravitational effect on the parent star, and so cause the largest changes in its radial velocity. Hot Jupiters have the greatest gravitational effect on their host stars because they have relatively small orbits and large masses. Observation of many separate spectral lines and many orbital periods allows the signal-to-noise ratio of observations to be increased, increasing the chance of observing smaller and more distant planets, but planets like the Earth remain undetectable with current instruments.

See also 
Methods of detecting exoplanets
Systemic (amateur extrasolar planet search project)

References

External links 
 California and Carnegie Extrasolar Planet Search
The Radial Velocity Equation in the Search for Exoplanets ( The Doppler Spectroscopy or Wobble Method )

Astronomical spectroscopy